Tom Mannion is a Scottish actor.

His television credits include Brookside, Up the Garden Path, The Bill, Boon, Cadfael, Doctor Finlay, Doctors, Eleventh Hour, Holby City, Roman Mysteries, Hustle, Life on Mars, Midsomer Murders, New Tricks, Red Cap, Secret Diary of a Call Girl, Spatz, Taggart, The Agatha Christie Hour, The Chief, The Royal, and Wycliffe.  He has recently been in the BBC TV series Lip Service, Moving On and Inside Men. In 2016, he starred in Mr Selfridge.

His film credits include Brothers, Beyond the Sea, Iris, Beautiful Creatures and Croupier as Detective Inspector Ross.

In 2011–12, he went on tour throughout the UK, playing Inspector Goole, in Stephen Daldry's production of An Inspector Calls.

In December 2012 he joined the cast of Emmerdale as horse trainer Steve Harland. He made his final appearance in the soap on 11 September 2013.

Filmography
That Sinking Feeling (1979) - The Doctor
Return of the Jedi (1983) - Commander Merrejk (Star Destroyer Captain #2)
Croupier (1998) - Ross
Beautiful Creatures (2000) - Brian McMinn
Iris (2001) - Neurologist
Brothers (2004) - Miles
Beyond the Sea (2004) - Movie Set Reporter
Centurion (2010) - General Tesio
F (2010) - Gary
Waterboys (2016) - James The Victim 2019

Selected theatre
 Patrick Nauldie  in American Bagpipes by Iain Heggie. World premiere directed by Casper Wrede at the Royal Exchange, Manchester. (1988)
 Dexter Haven in The Philadelphia Story by Philip Barry. Directed by Josephine Abady at the Royal Exchange, Manchester. (1996) 
 Thomas Armstrong in An Experiment with an Airpump by Shelagh Stephenson. World premiere directed by Matthew Lloyd at the Royal Exchange, Manchester.  (1998) 
 Antony in Antony and Cleopatra. Directed by Braham Murray at the Royal Exchange, Manchester. (2005)

External links
 

Year of birth missing (living people)
Living people
Scottish male television actors
Scottish male film actors